The Leaf class is a class of support tanker of the British Royal Fleet Auxiliary (RFA). The class is somewhat unusual as it is an amalgam of various civilian tankers chartered for naval auxiliary use and as such has included many different designs of ship. Leaf names are traditional tanker names in the RFA, and are recycled when charters end and new vessels are acquired. Thus, there have been multiple uses of the same names, sometimes also sharing a common pennant number.

For RAS, Leaf-class ships have an amidships derrick allowing a single vessel on either beam and a single point for a vessel astern.

Ships

RFA Appleleaf
 (1979–1989)  (ex-Hudson Cavalier) – A79 – 40,200 tons, to Royal Australian Navy as 
 (1960–1970)  – A83 – 22,980 tons

RFA Bayleaf
 (1982–2011)  (ex-Hudson Progress) – A109 – 37,700 tons, chartered originally for Falklands War
 (1959–1973)  – A79 –  17,960 tons

RFA Brambleleaf
 (1979–2009)  (ex-Hudson Deep) – A81 – 40,200 tons
 (1959–1972)  – A81 – 17,960 tons

RFA Cherryleaf
 (1973–1980)  – A82 – 18,560 tons
 (1960–1966)  – A82

RFA Oakleaf
 (1986–2009)  (ex-Oktania) – A111 – 50,000 tons

RFA Orangeleaf
 (1984–2015)  (ex-Balder London) – A110 – 33,750 tons
 (1959–1978)  – A80 – 17,470 tons

RFA Pearleaf
 (1960–1985)  – A77 – 25,790 tons

RFA Plumleaf
 (1960–1985)  – A78 – 26,480 tons

References

 
 
 
Auxiliary replenishment ship classes